HD 330075 is a star in the southern constellation of Norma. It has a yellow hue and an apparent visual magnitude of 9.36, which makes it too faint to be seen with the naked eye – it is visible only with telescope or powerful binoculars. Parallax measurements provide a distance estimate of 148 light years from the Sun, and it is drifting further away with a radial velocity of 62 km/s. The star is estimated to have come as close as  some 409 million years ago.

This object appears to be a slightly evolved dwarf with a spectral class of G5. That is, it is nearing the end of its main sequence lifetimes and is becoming a subgiant star. The star has very low chromospheric activity and is around five billion years old. It is smaller than the Sun with 86% of the Sun's mass and 85% of the solar radius. As a consequence, it is radiating just 39% of the luminosity of the Sun from its photosphere at an effective temperature of 4,967 K. It has a super-solar metallicity, which means the abundance of elements other than hydrogen and helium appears much higher than in the Sun.

Planetary system
In 2004, the discovery of a hot Jupiter planet orbiting close to the star was announced. This is the first planet discovered by the then-new HARPS spectrograph.

See also 
 List of stars with extrasolar planets

References

External links 
 

G-type main-sequence stars
Planetary systems with one confirmed planet
Norma (constellation)
CD-49 10033
330075
077517
J15493770-4957486